The Cavendish Astrophysics Group (formerly the Radio Astronomy Group) is based at the Cavendish Laboratory at the University of Cambridge. The group operates all of the telescopes at the Mullard Radio Astronomy Observatory except for the 32m MERLIN telescope, which is operated by Jodrell Bank.

The group is the second largest of three astronomy departments in the University of Cambridge.

Instruments under development by the group 
 The Atacama Large Millimeter Array (ALMA) - several modules of this international project
 The Magdalena Ridge Observatory Interferometer (MRO Interferometer)
 The SKA

Instruments in service 
 The Arcminute Microkelvin Imager (AMI)
 A Heterodyne Array Receiver for B-band (HARP-B) at the James Clerk Maxwell Telescope
 The Planck Surveyor

Previous instruments 
 The CLOVER telescope
 The Very Small Array
 The 5 km Ryle Telescope
 The Cambridge Optical Aperture Synthesis Telescope (COAST)
 The Cosmic Anisotropy Telescope
 The Cambridge Low Frequency Synthesis Telescope
 The Half-Mile Telescope
 The One-Mile Telescope
 The Interplanetary Scintillation Array which discovered the first pulsar
 The 4C Array which made the 4C catalogue
 The Cambridge Interferometer
 The Long Michelson Interferometer
 Various aperture masking instruments for optical aperture synthesis

Catalogues published by the group 
 Preliminary survey of the radio stars in the Northern Hemisphere (sometimes called the 1C catalogue) at 81.5-MHz (unreliable at low flux levels)
 2C catalogue 81.5-MHz (unreliable at low flux levels)
 3C catalogue 159 MHz
 4C catalogue 178 MHz
 5C catalogue 408 MHz and 1407 MHz
 6C catalogue 151 MHz
 7C catalogue 151 MHz
 8C catalogue 38 MHz
 9C catalogue 15 GHz
 10C catalogue 14–18 GHz
 Cambridge Interplanetary Scintillation survey

Famous Group Members 
 Sir Martin Ryle, 1918–1984, Nobel Prize for Physics, founder of the group, former British Astronomer Royal
 Tony Hewish, Nobel Prize for Physics, designed the telescope which discovered the first pulsars
 Malcolm Longair Jacksonian Professor of Natural Philosophy, former head of the Cavendish Laboratory
 Jocelyn Bell Burnell, detected the first signal from a pulsar
 John E. Baldwin
 Richard Edwin Hills
 F. Graham Smith - early co-worker with Ryle, later Astronomer Royal
 David Saint-Jacques Canadian astronaut

External links
Cavendish Astrophysics Group webpage

Cavendish Laboratory
Astronomy institutes and departments